Man to Man is a 2005 historical drama film directed by Régis Wargnier and starring Joseph Fiennes, Kristin Scott Thomas and Iain Glen. The screenplay concerns a man in a team of Victorian scientists conducting research in Africa, who begins to have doubts about the human cost of their mission. It was scripted by William Boyd.

Plot
In 1860, Victorian scientists capture a pygmy couple during an expedition in Central Africa. They are transported back to the United Kingdom for further study as part of research involving the theory of the evolution of man. However, the primitive outlook of the pygmies and the sophisticated methods used by the scientists, as well as the complications of adapting to a foreign environment, make their anthropological study all the more difficult. Ultimately, as the pygmies become more absorbed to the public, major disagreements erupt culminating in a bloody and tragic confrontation.

Cast 
 Joseph Fiennes as Jamie Dodd
 Kristin Scott Thomas as Elena Van Den Ende
 Iain Glen as Alexander Auchinleck
 Hugh Bonneville as Fraser McBride
 Lomama Boseki as Toko
 Cécile Bayiha as Likola
 Flora Montgomery as Abigail McBride

References

External links
 
 
 

2005 films
2000s historical drama films
English-language French films
Films directed by Régis Wargnier
Films set in the 1860s
French historical drama films
2000s French-language films
Films shot in Edinburgh
Films scored by Patrick Doyle
Films with screenplays by William Boyd (writer)
2005 drama films
2000s English-language films
2000s French films